Marshal of Châtillon may refer to more than one Marshal of France:

 Gaspard I de Coligny of the fifteenth and sixteenth centuries
 Gaspard III de Coligny of the seventeenth century